Wolf Run State Park is a  public recreation area located three miles north of the village of Caldwell, Ohio, in the United States. The state park features hiking on trails that include a section of the Buckeye Trail plus swimming, boating and fishing on  Wolf Run Lake.

References

External links
Wolf Run State Park Ohio Department of Natural Resources
Wolf Run State Park Map Ohio Department of Natural Resources

State parks of Ohio
Protected areas of Noble County, Ohio
Protected areas established in 1963
1963 establishments in Ohio